John Crocker Heap (9 November 1907 – 6 April 2000) was an English athlete who competed for Great Britain in the 1928 Summer Olympics. He was born in St Pancras, London.

In 1928 he was eliminated in the first round of the Olympic 100 metre event. At the 1930 Empire Games he won the silver medal with the English relay team in the 4×110 yards competition.

References

External links
sports-reference.com

1907 births
2000 deaths
English male sprinters
Olympic athletes of Great Britain
Athletes (track and field) at the 1928 Summer Olympics
Athletes (track and field) at the 1930 British Empire Games
Commonwealth Games silver medallists for England
Commonwealth Games medallists in athletics
People from St Pancras, London
Athletes from London
20th-century English people
Medallists at the 1930 British Empire Games